The Colwelliaceae are a family of Pseudomonadota. This family consists of facultative anaerobes and has non-motile and motile members.

References

External links
 J.P. Euzéby: List of Prokaryotic names with Standing in Nomenclature - Family Colwelliaceae

Alteromonadales